This is a list of tennis players who have represented the Sweden Fed Cup team in an official Fed Cup match. Sweden have taken part in the competition since 1964.

Players

References

External links
Svenska Tennisförbundet

Fed Cup
Lists of Billie Jean King Cup tennis players